Cape Sharbonneau is a rounded, snow-covered headland forming the south side of the entrance to Lehrke Inlet, on the east coast of Palmer Land, Antarctica. Members of the East Base of the United States Antarctic Service explored this coast in 1940. They charted this feature as an island which they named for Charles W. Sharbonneau, carpenter at East Base. It was determined to be a cape of Palmer Land in 1947 by a joint sledge party consisting of members of the Ronne Antarctic Research Expedition and the Falkland Islands Dependencies Survey.

References
 

Headlands of Palmer Land